"Cannibal" is the debut solo single by Mumford & Sons frontman Marcus Mumford, released on 14 July 2022 by Capitol Records. It is the lead single from his solo debut album Self-Titled, and was produced by Blake Mills.

Style and reception 
Per Consequences Abby Jones, the song is "a somber, rootsy tune that feels a bit like a pared-down version of Mumford & Sons' arena-sized folk rock—that is, until around the three-minute mark, when the song transforms from an acoustic ballad into a rousing barnburner", and has lyrics which "sees Mumford break away from a parasitic relationship" with lyrics including "You took the first slice of me and you ate it raw/ Ripped at it with your teeth and your lips like a cannibal/ You fucking animal" in the first verse and "Help me know how to begin again" in the song's climax. DIYs Emma Swann notes "Cannibal" as one of the songs on the album where Mumford "strips it right back", bringing out "a warm quality to his songwriting that seeps through." The Independents Helen Brown notes a moment where the song's "suppressed, acoustic intensity ... explodes into a synth-backed crescendo", with "Mumford's big yearning yawp of a voice ... buried behind the instrumentation", "as though he's handing over the experience." Brown calls it an effective technique and "evocative of the hushed circle of chairs at a support group." NMEs Elizabeth Aubrey emphasises the song's "downcast fingerpicking", calling it "sonically sparse".

In an interview with GQs Zach Baron, Mumford confessed the lyrics were about his experience being sexually abused as a child, with the song containing lyrics explicitly about the matter such as the lines "I can still taste you and I hate it" and "That wasn't a choice in the mind of a child and you knew it".

Music video 
A music video for the song was released 18 July 2022, helmed by first time music video director Steven Spielberg. The video was shot in a high school gym in New York and filmed in one take entirely on Spielberg's phone. The crew also included Spielberg's wife Kate Capshaw as producer, art director and dolly grip; Mumford's wife Carey Mulligan as costumer and sound engineer; and Kristie Macosko Krieger as co-producer and behind-the-scenes videographer.

Personnel 
 Marcus Mumford – vocals, acoustic guitar, electric guitar, drums, songwriting
 Blake Mills – producer, acoustic guitar, electric guitar, drums, percussion, organ, synthesiser, mixing engineer
 Jim Keltner – cymbals
 Joseph Lorge – recording and mixing engineer
 Patricia Sullivan – mastering engineer
 Danielle Goldsmith, Gabe Lowry, Logan Taylor, and Scott Moore – assistant recording engineers

References

2022 singles
2022 songs
Marcus Mumford songs
Capitol Records singles
Songs about sexual assault
Songs about child abuse
Song recordings produced by Blake Mills
Songs written by Blake Mills
Songs written by Marcus Mumford